María Teresa Cazorla Medina (born June 18, 1997), known as Maite Cazorla, is a Spanish professional basketball player for the Perfumerias Avenida of Liga Endesa and the Spanish women's national basketball team. She was drafted with the twenty third overall pick in the 2019 WNBA draft.

Youth career
Coming from a family of professional basketball players, Cazorla started playing basketball at 14 with her school team Teresianas before joining the youth system of CB Islas Canarias. At the age of 14 she left the Canary Islands and moved Barcelona to continue her development in the youth teams of Segle XXI in 2011.

She progressed in the club, playing in the Spanish second-tier league and the Spanish national youth teams until her performance in the 2014 FIBA Under-17 World Championship for Women caught the eye of the Oregon Ducks scouts.

College career

Cazorla attended the University of Oregon from 2015 to 2019.  She played all four years, and was named to the Pac-12 All-Freshman team in 2015.  She was named to the All-Pac-12 team in her Junior and Senior years.  In 2019, she played with the team that made it to the Final Four.  In total, Cazorla played in 146 games for the Ducks over her four-year career.  Cazorla was the eighth player from Oregon selected in the WNBA Draft.

Oregon statistics

Source

WNBA career

Cazorla made her WNBA debut on May 31, 2019, in a game versus the Seattle Storm.  She totaled 3 points in her 5 minutes in the game.

WNBA career statistics

Regular season

|-
| align="left" | 2019
| align="left" | Atlanta
| 31 || 1 || 15.4 || .312 || .236 || .875 || 0.7 || 1.6 || 0.6 || 0.0 || 0.9 || 3.0
|-
| align="left" | Career
| align="left" | 1 year, 1 team
| 31 || 1 || 15.4 || .312 || .236 || .875 || 0.7 || 1.6 || 0.6 || 0.0 || 0.9 || 3.0

Club career
Back in Spain, in June 2019, she signed for CB Avenida, one of the top teams of the Spanish top-tier league, winning her first title in 2020, the Spanish Queen's Cup and participating in the 2019-20 EuroCup Women.

European Cups statistics

In her debut season in international club competitions, she has played 10 games in the 2019–20 EuroCup Women, averaging 19.2 MPG and 4.4 PPG.

National team

Cazorla started playing with Spain's youth teams at 14, winning a total of seven medals from 2012 to 2017. Her highlights on these teams include a European U16 title in 2013, a runner-up finish at the U17 FIBA World Championships in 2014, and a third-place finish at the U19 FIBA World Championships in 2015. She made her debut with the senior team in 2019, when she was 22 years old. Up to 2021, she had 19 caps and participated in the 2020 Olympics and the 2021 EuroBasket.

  2012 FIBA Europe Under-16 Championship (youth) 
  2013 FIBA Europe Under-16 Championship (youth) 
  2014 FIBA Under-17 World Championship (youth)
  2014 FIBA Europe Under-18 Championship (youth)
 4th 2015 FIBA Under-19 World Championship (youth)
  2015 FIBA Europe Under-18 Championship (youth)
  2016 FIBA Europe Under-20 Championship (youth)
  2017 FIBA Europe Under-20 Championship (youth)
 7th 2021 Eurobasket
 6th 2020 Summer Olympics

Ntees

References

External links
 Maite Cazorla at Oregon Ducks
 Maite Cazorla at WNBA
 
 
 
 
 

1997 births
Living people
Atlanta Dream draft picks
Atlanta Dream players
Basketball players at the 2020 Summer Olympics
Guards (basketball)
Olympic basketball players of Spain
Oregon Ducks women's basketball players
Spanish expatriate basketball people in the United States
Spanish women's basketball players
Sportspeople from Las Palmas